John C. Van Hollen (June 27, 1933) is a Wisconsin businessman and politician.

Born in Rhinelander, Wisconsin, he grew up in Chetek, Wisconsin. He served in the United States military during the Korean War and graduated from University of Wisconsin.
Van Hollen served in the Wisconsin State Assembly in 1967 and 1969. Van Hollen owns a real estate business in Northern Wisconsin. His son is the Wisconsin Attorney General J. B. Van Hollen.

References

People from Rhinelander, Wisconsin
People from Chetek, Wisconsin
University of Wisconsin–Madison alumni
Members of the Wisconsin State Assembly
Businesspeople from Wisconsin
Military personnel from Wisconsin
1933 births
Living people